The Ku Music Asian Music Awards is a Chinese music awards

Foundation
The Ku Music Asian Music Awards was founded by Chinese music streaming and download services KuGou and KuWo in 2015.

References

Tencent
Tencent Music
2015 establishments in China
Annual events in China
Chinese music awards
Recurring events established in 2015
Awards established in 2015